The Heritage School, Kolkata in West Bengal, India, is an elite day-boarding school affiliated with the CISCE board, following the ICSE/ISC syllabuses. 
The school also launched an International Baccalaureate Diploma Programme (IBDP) in 2012 and IGCSE in 2013. The Heritage School is part of the Heritage Group of Institutions, an initiative of the Kalyan Bharti Trust.

The outdoor games program offers cricket, football, athletics, tennis, basketball, volleyball, swimming, rock climbing, rifle shooting, archery and roller skating. Indoor games include table tennis, badminton, chess and multigym.

References

External links

Primary schools in West Bengal
High schools and secondary schools in Kolkata
Educational institutions established in 2001
2001 establishments in West Bengal